Bolden is a 2019 American drama film based on the life of cornetist Buddy Bolden (1877–1931). One of the seminal figures in jazz history, Bolden left no surviving recordings, having been committed in 1907 at age 30 to the Louisiana State Insane Asylum, where he spent the rest of his life after a diagnosis of acute alcoholic psychosis.

The musical drama is directed by Daniel Pritzker, and features original music written, arranged and performed by Wynton Marsalis. The film stars Gary Carr as Bolden, and co-stars Erik LaRay Harvey, Reno Wilson, Yaya DaCosta, Ian McShane and Michael Rooker.

The score by Marsalis includes vocalists Catherine Russell, Brianna Thomas, Don Vappie, and instrumentalists including Wycliffe Gordon, Victor Goines, Marcus Printup, and others. The film contains performances by Reno Wilson playing Louis Armstrong (acting and singing).

Bolden was released in theaters on May 3, 2019, by Abramorama.

Cast
 Gary Carr as Charles "Buddy" Bolden
 Erik LaRay Harvey as Bartley
 Ian McShane as Judge Leander Perry
 Michael Rooker as Pat McMurphy
 Yaya DaCosta as Nora Bolden
 Reno Wilson as Louis Armstrong
 Robert Ri'chard as George Baquet
 Karimah Westbrook as Alice Bolden
 Breon Pugh as Willie Warner
 Ser'Darius Blain as Willie Cornish

Reception
On Metacritic, the film has a weighted average score of 50 out of 100, based on 10 critics, indicating "mixed or average reviews".

References

External links
 
 

2019 films
African-American biographical dramas
African-American drama films
Films shot in New Orleans
Films shot in North Carolina
Films scored by Mark Isham
2010s English-language films
2010s American films
Biographical films about musicians